Ana Isabel Álvarez-Diosdado Gisbert OAXS (21 May 1938 – 5 October 2015) better known as Ana Diosdado was a dual Argentine-Spanish actress, playwright, theater director, and writer. Her acting credits include the television series, Las llaves de la independencia. Diosdado's work as a playwright includes Forget the Drums, which debuted in Zamora, Spain, on 28 June 1970.

Diosdado was born on 21 May 1938 in Buenos Aires, Argentina, to Spanish parents, Enrique Diosdado, an actor, and Isabel Gisbert, who had fled the Spanish Civil War.

Ana Diosdado died from complications of cardiorespiratory failure during a meeting at the Sociedad General de Autores in Madrid, Spain, on 5 October 2015, at the age of 77.

Filmography

Writer

Actress

1974: Juan y Manuela (TV Series, 13 episodes)
1983: Anillos de oro (TV Series, 13 episodes,)
1986: Segunda enseñanza (TV Series 1986), 13 episodes)
2008: El libro de las aguas

Director

1995: Función de noche (TV Series, 1 episode)

Honours 

 Dame Grand Cross of the Civil Order of Alfonso X, the Wise (Posthumous, Kingdom of Spain, 9 October 2015).

References

1938 births
2015 deaths
Spanish theatre directors
20th-century Spanish actresses
Spanish television actresses
Spanish stage actresses
Spanish dramatists and playwrights
Spanish women dramatists and playwrights
People from Buenos Aires
Argentine film actresses